Joseph Anthony Tainter (born December 8, 1949) is an American anthropologist and historian.

Biography
Tainter studied anthropology at the University of California, Berkeley and Northwestern University, where he received his Ph.D. in 1975.  he holds a professorship in the Department of Environment and Society at Utah State University. His previous positions include Project Leader of Cultural Heritage Research, Rocky Mountain Forest and Range Experiment Station, Albuquerque, New Mexico and Assistant Professor of Anthropology at the University of New Mexico.

Tainter has written and edited many articles and monographs. His best-known work, The Collapse of Complex Societies (1988), examines the collapse of Maya and Chacoan civilizations,
and of the Western Roman Empire, in terms of network theory, energy economics and complexity theory. Tainter argues that sustainability or collapse of societies follow from the success or failure of problem-solving institutions and that societies collapse when their investments in social complexity and their energy subsidies reach a point of diminishing marginal returns. He recognizes collapse when a society involuntarily sheds a significant portion of its complexity.

With Tadeusz Patzek, he is author of Drilling Down: The Gulf Oil Debacle and Our Energy Dilemma, published in 2011.

Joseph Tainter is married to Bonnie Bagley and they have one child, Emmet Bagley Tainter.

Social complexity 
As described in Tainter's Collapse of Complex Societies, societies become more complex as they try to solve problems.  Social complexity can be recognized by numerous differentiated and specialised social and economic roles and many mechanisms through which they are coordinated, and by reliance on symbolic and abstract communication, and the existence of a class of information producers and analysts who are not involved in primary resource production.  Such complexity requires a substantial "energy" subsidy (meaning the consumption of resources, or other forms of wealth).

When a society confronts a "problem," such as a shortage of energy, or difficulty in gaining access to it, it tends to create new layers of bureaucracy, infrastructure, or social class to address the challenge. Tainter, who first identifies seventeen examples of rapid collapse of societies, applies his model to three case studies: The Western Roman Empire, the Maya civilization, and the Chaco culture.

For example, as Roman agricultural output slowly declined and population increased, per-capita energy availability dropped. The Romans "solved" this problem by conquering their neighbours to appropriate their energy surpluses (as metals, grain, slaves, other materials of value). However, as the Empire grew, the cost of maintaining communications, garrisons, civil government, etc. grew with it.  Eventually, this cost grew so great that any new challenges such as invasions and crop failures could not be solved by the acquisition of more territory.

Intense, authoritarian efforts to maintain cohesion by Domitian and Constantine the Great only led to an ever greater strain on the population. The empire was split into two halves, of which the western soon fragmented into smaller units. The eastern half, being wealthier, was able to survive longer, and did not collapse but instead succumbed slowly and piecemeal, because unlike the western empire it had powerful neighbors able to take advantage of its weakness.

It is often assumed that the collapse of the western Roman Empire was a catastrophe for everyone involved.  Tainter points out that it can be seen as a very rational preference of individuals at the time, many of whom were actually better off. Tainter notes that in the west, local populations in many cases greeted the barbarians as liberators.

Diminishing returns
Tainter begins by categorizing and examining the often inconsistent explanations that have been offered for collapse in the literature. In Tainter's view, while invasions, crop failures, disease or environmental degradation may be the apparent causes of societal collapse, the ultimate cause is an economic one, inherent in the structure of society rather than in external shocks which may batter them:  diminishing returns on investments in social complexity. Finally, Tainter musters modern statistics to show that marginal returns on investments in energy (EROEI), education and technological innovation are diminishing today.  The globalised modern world is subject to many of the same stresses that brought older societies to ruin.

However, Tainter is not entirely apocalyptic:  "When some new input to an economic system is brought on line, whether a technical innovation or an energy subsidy, it will often have the potential at least temporarily to raise marginal productivity".  Thus, barring continual conquest of your neighbors (which is always subject to diminishing returns), innovation that increases productivity is – in the long run – the only way out of the dilemma of declining marginal returns on added investments in complexity.

And, in his final chapters, Tainter discusses why modern societies may not be able to choose to collapse: because surrounding them are other complex societies which will in some way absorb a collapsed region or prevent a general collapse; the Mayan and Chacoan regions had no powerful complex neighbors and so could collapse for centuries or millennia, as could the Western Roman Empire - but the Eastern Roman Empire, bordered as it was by the Parthian/Sassanid Empire, did not have the option of devolving into simpler, smaller entities.

His paper Complexity, Problem Solving, and Sustainable Societies (1996) focuses on the energy cost of problem solving, and the energy-complexity relation in manmade systems.
The 2018 study, "Toward a General Theory of Societal Collapse. A Biophysical Examination of Tainter's Model of the Diminishing Returns of Complexity", by Ugo Bardi, Sara Falsini, and Ilaria Perissi, introduced a socioeconomic system model in support of Tainter's diminishing returns mechanism.

Works

See also

Societal collapse
Collapsology
State collapse 
Wicked problem

References

Further reading
 Kohr, Leopold: The Breakdown of Nations, 1957.

External links
 Utah State University, Joseph Tainter official faculty page
 How Do You Know When Society Is About to Fall Apart? New York Times Magazine, November 4, 2020.
 
 , read by Joseph Tainter, videos 1 of 7
 Archaeology, History and Sustainability, audio commentary by Joseph Tainter
 Societal Complexity and Collapse, Omega Tau audio interview with Joseph Tainter recorded October 2015

 
1949 births
21st-century American historians
21st-century American male writers
Historians of antiquity
American anthropologists
Energy economists
Living people
University of California, Berkeley alumni
Northwestern University alumni
University of New Mexico faculty
Utah State University faculty
American male non-fiction writers